Lists of countries by GDP per capita list the countries in the world by their gross domestic product (GDP) per capita. The lists may be based on nominal or purchasing power parity GDP. Gross national income (GNI) per capita accounts for inflows and outflows of foreign capital. Income inequality metrics measure the distribution of income between rich and poor.

Lists
GDP
 List of countries by GDP (nominal) per capita
 List of countries by GDP (PPP) per capita
GNI
 List of countries by GNI (nominal) per capita
 List of countries by GNI (PPP) per capita

Lists of countries by GDP